Take Your Time may refer to:

Take Your Time (Scatman John album), 1999
Take Your Time (Kulcha album), 1997
"Take Your Time", a 1958 Buddy Holly song, the B-side of "Rave On"
"Take Your Time" (Lynyrd Skynyrd song), 1974
"Take Your Time (Do It Right)", a 1980 song by The S.O.S. Band
"Take Your Time", a 1990 song by Mantronix featuring Wondress from the album This Should Move Ya
"Take Your Time" (Sam Hunt song), 2014